This is a list of  Time Team  episodes from series 14.

Episode

Series 14

Episode # refers to the air date order. The Time Team Specials are aired in between regular episodes, but are omitted from this list. Regular contributors on Time Team include: Tony Robinson (presenter); archaeologists Mick Aston, Phil Harding, Helen Geake, Brigid Gallagher, Raksha Dave, Matt Williams; Francis Pryor (historian); Jackie McKinley (osteoarchaeologist); Victor Ambrus (illustrator); Stewart Ainsworth (landscape investigator); John Gater (geophysicist); Henry Chapman (surveyor); Paul Blinkhorn (pottery); Mark Corney (Roman expert); Raysan Al-Kubaisi (computer graphics).

References

External links
Time Team at Channel4.com
The Unofficial Time Team site Fan site

Time Team (Series 14)
2007 British television seasons